John G. Canty (January 30, 1917 - January 7, 1992) was an American Thoroughbred horse racing trainer.

A native of Ireland, he came from a dynasty of Curragh racehorse trainers, including his father James (Jimmy) Canty, his maternal grandfather Philip (Philly) Behan and a great-grandfather Dan Broderick of Mountjoy Lodge.  Other trainers in the extended family included his brother Phil Canty, their uncle Joe Canty (also for many decades Ireland's most successful jockey by lifetime wins) and Joe's son Joseph M. Canty.

Originally a jockey, John served his apprenticeship with R. C. Dawson in England and later rode for his father's Curragh stable.

He emigrated to the United States in 1953 and settled in California. After working in the horse racing industry, in 1959 he became a professional trainer.  During his thirty-three year career, John Canty's best known horse was Unconscious, a colt owned by Arthur A. Seeligson Jr. Unconscious notably won the San Felipe Handicap,  San Antonio Handicap, California Derby, Santa Catalina Stakes, and the Charles H. Strub Stakes and was the betting favorite in the 1971 Kentucky Derby in which he ran fifth.

John Canty was a partner with Castlebrook Farm in the horse Nor II who he conditioned to win the 1972 San Luis Rey Handicap.

A resident of Arcadia, California, John Canty died of pneumonia at age seventy-four at Huntington Memorial Hospital in Pasadena.

References

1917 births
1992 deaths
American racehorse trainers
Sportspeople from California
Irish emigrants to the United States
Deaths from pneumonia in California